"I will leb'n" is a song originally recorded by Austrian band Steirerbluat, later notably covered by DJ Ötzi.

Charts

Weekly charts

Year-end charts

References

DJ Ötzi songs
2007 singles
2007 songs
Universal Music Group singles